Storm Over Arnhem is a 1981 board wargame designed by Courtney F. Allen, published by the Avalon Hill game company, and depicts the battle for Arnhem bridge over the Lower Rhine river during Operation Market Garden in World War II. This battle was fought between elements of the British 1st Airborne Division and elements of the German Bocholt Battalion and 9th and 10th SS Panzer Divisions. The plan was for the airborne forces to seize and hold the Arnhem bridge for two days, before being relieved by the British XXX Corps. However, Operation Market Garden failed in numerous places, and the airborne troops were never relieved. They did however achieve more than their objective by capturing and holding the northern end of the Arnhem Bridge with some 700+ men for four days.

Game-play 

The game recreates the fighting around the northern end of Arnhem bridge during the days of September 18 through September 21, 1944. One player controls the British units, while a second player controls the Germans.

Initial unit deployment is semi-free. For example, a certain number of SS units must be placed in each initial deployment zone, but the German player is free to choose which units he will put there.

The game is divided into a number of turns. A day turn is 6 hours, and a night turn is 12 hours, and there are three turns in a single day, 2 day turns and 1 night turn. Each turn is divided into 5 phases: Reinforcement & Reformed Units Phase, Random Events Phase, Movement/Fire Phase, Close Combat Phase and the Victory Point Determination Phase.

The Movement/Fire Phase consists of a number of player impulses, which means that during this phase a player can move or attack with his uncommitted units in a single area. An uncommitted unit differs from a committed unit by the fact that the latter is a unit that has already moved or attacked on that same turn, or that the unit has taken casualties or was forced to retreat on that turn. Players alternate impulses until there are no more uncommitted units, or both players pass their impulse. Next the close combat phase is played out for each area containing both British and German units.

The objective of the game is for the Germans to gain at least 22 victory point by the end of the last turn, to win a marginal victory, or for the British to withhold the Germans from those victory point. Victory points are allocated for every victory point area the German player occupies.

Game-board 

The game-board is a map of the surroundings of the northern side of Arnhem bridge on a 1" = 100' scale and is divided into 30 areas of various size and shape to represent the unique characteristics of both the build-up in the area (such as buildings and trees) and the line of sight, which determines and limits the possibilities of attacking and moving units across the board. This system is known as the area movement system, as opposed to the hexagonal boards, where units attack and move through a number of hexes. Storm Over Arnhem was the first game to use the area movement system, which was later used in such games as Break Out:Normandy and Thunder Over Casino. Axis & Allies and Risk are also examples of area movement systems. Surrounding the Arnhem map are five movement zones, depicting the areas outside Arnhem, which can be used to quickly move units from one side of town to the other side.

Variant 

The game came with a number of counters (playing pieces) which were not used with the basic game, but could be used for playing a variant game of Storm Over Arnhem. That variant game would be published in a future issue of Avalon Hill's The General Magazine. The variant was called The Crossing, and let the players recreate the famous and costly assault by Viktor Graebner's reconnaissance unit (of the German 9th SS Panzer Division) across the Arnhem bridge, where they suffered heavy losses. Also, the variant game begins on the evening of September 17, instead of the afternoon of September 18. The British units start out in the movement zones, and the only German units in Arnhem consist of a small Arnhem Garrison.

General Magazine 

Avalon Hill's The General Magazine published a series of articles on Storm Over Arnhem, including a variant to the game, as mentioned above. A two-part series replay was also printed.

Volume 19, Number 1
"The Combatants of Arnhem" (contrasting approaches to Storm Over Arnhem)
"The Crossing" (variant rules)
Series replay
Design analysis
Volume 19, Number 2
Series replay (part II)
Volume 21, Number 1
"The Nieuwe Kade Gambit" (defensive set-up for the British)
Volume 22, Number 3
 "A Bridge Not Too Far" (British strategy for the variant)
Volume 25, Number 3
"Prelude to the Storm Over Arnhem" (a historical perspective)

Reception
Storm Over Arnhem was awarded the Charles S. Roberts Award for "Best 20th Century Boardgame of 1982".

Reviews
 Casus Belli #25 (April 1985)
1982 Games 100 in Games

References

External links

Avalon Hill games
Board games introduced in 1981
Origins Award winners
World War II board wargames